The First Presbyterian Church is a historic Greek Revival church building in Eutaw, Alabama.  The two-story frame structure was built for the local Presbyterian congregation in 1851 by David R. Anthony.  Anthony was a local contractor who constructed many of Eutaw's antebellum buildings.  The congregation was organized by the Tuscaloosa Presbytery in 1824 as the Mesopotamia Presbyterian Church.  John H. Gray served as the first minister from 1826 until 1836.  The church was added to the National Register of Historic Places on December 16, 1974, due to its architectural and historical significance.  
The church is a member of the Presbyterian Church in America.

References

External links
 

National Register of Historic Places in Greene County, Alabama
Churches on the National Register of Historic Places in Alabama
Churches completed in 1851
19th-century Presbyterian church buildings in the United States
Greek Revival church buildings in Alabama
Presbyterian Church in America churches in Alabama
Historic American Buildings Survey in Alabama
1851 establishments in Alabama